Maja Ross Andres Salvador (born October 5, 1988) is a Filipino actress, performer, television host, occasional producer, and talent manager. Referred to as the “Majestic Superstar”and the "Queen of Revenge Drama", Salvador is a recipient of an Asia Contents Awards, including nominations from FAMAS Awards, Asian Academy Creative Awards, and Asian Television Awards.

She made her acting debut at age 14 on television in a minor role for It Might Be You (TV series) (2003), which gained her a nomination for Best New TV Personality at the 18th PMPC Star Awards for Television. Her film debut happened three years later in a supporting role for Sukob  (2006), which she was nominated for Best Supporting Actress at the 55th FAMAS Awards and Gawad PASADO Awards 2007, while she won the Most Promising Female Star at the 37th GMMSF Box-Office Entertainment Awards, New Movie Actress of the Year at the 23rd PMPC Star Awards for Movies, and Breakthrough Performance by an Actress at the 4th ENPRESS Golden Screen Awards.  In 2011, Salvador co-produced and portrayed the title role in the film Thelma, which earned her the 35th Gawad Urian Award and the 30th Luna Awards (Film Academy of the Philippines Award) for Best Actress in 2012.

Since her debut, she garnered subsequent success and awards for her lead roles in the TV series Nagsimula sa Puso (2009), PHR Presents:Impostor (2010), Minsan Lang Kita Iibigin (2011), Ina, Kapatid, Anak (2012), The Legal Wife (2014), Bridges of Love (2015) and FPJ's Ang Probinsyano (2015). Salvador cemented a superstardom status when she portrayed Lily Cruz / Ivy Aguas in the top-tier revenge-drama series Wildflower (2017). Aside from the high ratings and advertising loads, the show gave Salvador a swept nominations for Best Actress at the prestigious Asian Academy Creative Awards (2018), Asian Television Awards (2018), and won the Asia Contents Awards in 2019 where Wildflower is also nominated for Best Asian Drama. Her critical acclaim was followed by her role as Camila dela Torre in another quality revenge-drama The Killer Bride (2019), which is a National Winner at the Asian Academy Creative Awards 2020 for Best Telenovela.

Following ABS-CBN's free tv shutdown In May 2020 Salvador's home network since 2003, her contract with Star Magic has expired. In 2021, after 18 years, Salvador left Star Magic and decided to establish her own talent agency, Crown Artist Management. At present, Salvador plays the lead role Niña in Niña Niño, a primetime comedy-drama series broadcast by TV5 every Monday-Friday (Monday, Tuesday and Thursday during PBA seasons). The series is the National Winner at the Asian Academy Creative Awards 2021 for Best Drama Series, while Salvador hailed as the National Winner for Best Actress. She is also one of the Head Hunters in POPinoy, TV5's reality-show to unleash ultimate Pinoy pop idols, broadcasting every Sunday. Considered as a freelancer, Salvador crossed tv network as host and performer of the long-running noontime show Eat Bulaga!'s dance segment, DC 2021, every Monday to Saturday broadcast by GMA Network.

Before she became an established actress, Salvador was first noticed and admired by the public as a charismatic performer on stage and dubbed as the Dance Princess. Today, aside from being a respected Multi-Awarded and Versatile actress, she is widely acknowledged as the Philippines Entertainment's Queen of the Dance Floor.

Early life
Maja Ross Andres Salvador was born in Aparri, Cagayan, Philippines, on October 5, 1988. Her mother is Thelma Andres while her father, Ross Rival, was a former actor. Salvador is a member of a family of actors which includes her father, Ross Rival, uncle Phillip Salvador and half-brother Jon Hernandez.

Acting career

2003–2009: Beginnings and breakthrough
Salvador started her career in show business lightly. She played a minor role in It Might Be You (2003–2004), a series starring John Lloyd Cruz and Bea Alonzo. For the series Salvador garnered her first nomination for Best New Female TV Personality. After It Might Be You, Salvador then started appearing in ASAP (2003–2020). She then started pairing up with other teen actors such as Rayver Cruz, John Wayne Sace, and Hero Angeles for the now defunct teenage television series Nginiig (2004–2006). Salvador, along with Cruz, Sace and Angeles, were all hosts of the series.

She then reunited with co-stars Rayver Cruz and John Wayne Sace for another teen-oriented television series. Salvador became part of the cast of Spirits (2004–2005), portraying the role of Gabby, an overachiever kid whose sunny ways ensures she is liked by everyone she meets. Salvador starred in several episodes of Maalaala Mo Kaya, a drama anthology series, and gained a nomination for Best Single Performance by an Actress for an episode entitled Regalo (2006). In 2006, Salvador made her film debut in the horror themed movie Sukob. She was nominated and won several awards for the movie, including Best Supporting Actress award. The film is considered one of the most scariest horror Filipino films made of all times. It topbilled actress Kris Aquino and Claudine Barretto.

After the success of her first film, Sukob, Salvador then starred in the Philippine comedy film First Day High (2006), opposite Kim Chiu, Gerald Anderson, Geoff Eigenmann and Jason Abalos. Shortly afterwards, she then became part of the cast of Sa Piling Mo (2006) playing the role of Marisa. Salvador gained even more fame after starring in the prime time series Pangarap na Bituin (2007). The series is the 2nd highest Musical Prime Time series after Sharon Cuneta's Bituing Walang Ningning. She then gained even more popularity after starring in One More Chance (2007), reuniting with It Might Be You co-stars John Lloyd Cruz and Bea Alonzo. Salvador received a nomination for Movie Supporting Actress of the Year.  Salvador then starred in Susan Roces's Pataying Sa Sindak Si Barbara (2008), alongside Kris Aquino, Jodi Sta. Maria and veteran actress, Susan Roces.

After portraying several supporting roles in movies and television series, Salvador got her first leading role in Nagsimula sa Puso (2009–2010). The series revolves around a teacher named Celina who falls in love with her own student. This is the first partnership of love-team Maja Salvador and Coco Martin. Salvador stars opposite Nikki Gil, Jason Abalos and Jaclyn Jose. While also doing this series, she was also, at the time, also starring in the child-themed series May Bukas Pa (2009–2010), with child actor Zaijian Jaranilla. Salvador became a well known name after playing the roles of "Celina Fernandez" and "Stella Rodrigo".

2010–2014: Rising star
Salvador experienced career expansion after playing several minor and supporting roles. She became the leading lady of Sam Milby during the 11th installment of the Precious Hearts Romances series. She, along with Milby, starred in the series entitled Impostor (2010). Shortly after, Salvador got another leading role in the miniseries of Wansapanataym entitled Inday sa Balitaw (2010). Salvador played the title role in the inspirational family drama film, Thelma (2011). She received 2 awards for the category of Best Actress for the film. Besides that, Salvador was also nominated twice.

She then became part of the cast in Minsan Lang Kita Iibigin (2011). Reuniting with her Nagsimula sa Puso leading man, Coco Martin, Salvador also starred with Andi Eigenmann, Martin del Rosario and veteran actress Lorna Tolentino. The series made Salvador's profile grow even more. After the successful finale of Minsan Lang Kita Iibigin, Salvador joined the cast of My Binondo Girl (2011–2012), reuniting for her First Day High co-star Kim Chiu. She played the role of Amber Dionisio, a rival of Jade (Chiu). Salvador then starred in the film My Cactus Heart (2012) with Xian Lim and Matteo Guidicelli, who she once starred with in the comedy-romance television series My Binondo Girl.

Shortly after My Cactus Heart, Salvador then became part of the cast in the anthology comedy film 24/7 in Love (2012). For her part in the film, Salvador was paired up with actor, Diether Ocampo. Their part in the film is about an officer worker (Salvador) and her boss (Ocampo) who then fall in love. The film involved showing some nude scenes including Diether Ocampo's posterior showing with Salvador in the room. She then returned to television and starred in another installment of the Precious Hearts Romances series. Salvador was once again the starring role and the series was entitled Lumayo Ka Man Sa Akin (2012). She starred alongside Jason Abalos and Patrick Garcia.

Salvador then paired up with Kim Chiu, Xian Lim and Enchong Dee in the critically acclaimed prime time television series Ina, Kapatid, Anak (2012–2013). Portraying the role of Margaux Marasigan, she plays the main anti-heroine of the series. The series scored a great beginner rating of 25.8%, while the finale episode showed great appreciation from viewers garnering a 42.9% final episode. Following her successful portrayal in the series, Salvador received two nominations for Best Drama Actress for her role as Margaux. After Ina, Kapatid, Anak, Salvador did another comedy film and collaborated with Paulo Avelino and Jake Cuenca in Status: It's Complicated (2013), a remake of the 1979 comedy Salawahan.

In 2014, Salvador became part of the highly controversial prime time television series, The Legal Wife, starring alongside veteran actress Angel Locsin, Jericho Rosales and JC de Vera. She plays main antagonist of the series being the mistress of Adrian (Rosales) and rival to Monica (Locsin). For her involvement in The Legal Wife, Salvador got nominated for Best Drama Actress. Towards the end of the year, Salvador starred in the daytime television series, Give Love on Christmas (2014–2015). She did the 2nd installment of the series and it was titled The Gift of Life.

2015–2019: Critical success and recognition
After Give Love on Christmas, Salvador's first project of 2015 was the critically acclaimed drama Bridges of Love, which showed in Latin countries including Peru. Salvador plays the lead role, Mia, who is torn between two lovers, Gael and Carlos, who are fighting for her love and are unknowingly biological brothers. She stars with Jericho Rosales, Paulo Avelino, Carmina Villarroel and veteran actor Edu Manzano. The series started off with a great beginning with a 21.9% in ratings and ended off with a 26.9% finale. For her portrayal as Mia, she got nominated once for Best Drama Actress, while winning the award three times in 2015–2016. While filming Bridges of Love, Salvador also starred in the movie You're Still the One (2015), opposite Richard Yap, Ellen Adarna and Dennis Trillo. The story focuses on the life of Elisse (Salvador) and how she is torn by choosing the right man who came at the wrong time or the wrong man who came at the right time.

Salvador then reunited with her Minsan Lang Kita Iibigin on-screen partner Coco Martin for a new project. She starred in FPJ's Ang Probinsyano (2015–2016) opposite Susan Roces, Bela Padilla, John Prats, Arjo Atayde, Jaime Fabregas, Albert Martinez, Eddie Garcia and Agot Isidro. The series is one of the most highly rated television series ever produced by ABS-CBN by getting a 41.6% on its pilot episode. Salvador portrayed the role of SPO1 Glen Corpuz who is Cardo's (Martin) childhood best friend and police partner who secretly admires him. However, in August 2016, Salvador departed from the series with her contract ending. Her character was replaced by Yassi Pressman. She reprises her role for the comedy television series Home Sweetie Home (2016) as Glen Corpuz.

After her character's departure from Ang Probinsyano, Salvador plays the lead protagonist of the series in Wildflower (2017 – February 2018). In the series, she portrays the strong willed and vengeful Lily Cruz. The series occupied the pre-primetime slot, which is before ABS-CBN's flagship news show TV Patrol from February 2017 – February 2018. The series enjoys high ratings with 20.1% for its pilot episode and peaking at 35.2%. The series, specifically the confrontation scenes of her character and Emilia Ardiente (played by her co-actress Aiko Melendez) is popular in social media and had been a subject of several memes.

In 2017, Salvador played the role of Caridad Sonia “Carson” Herrera in JP Habac's critically acclaimed independent film I'm Drunk, I Love You. Salvador's nuanced performance as the film's hopeless-romantic female lead led to nominations at the 2018 FAMAS Awards and the 34th PMPC Star Awards for Movies, and won her the best actress award at the 5th Urduja Film Festival Heritage Films Awards.

In 2019, Salvador returned to TV with two projects, first was being a judge in World of Dance Philippines, before returning to teleserye via The Killer Bride, where she portrayed Camila Dela Torre and co-starred with her niece Janella Salvador. The tale stems from a woman named Camila dela Torre, who in 1999—right before her wedding day, "killed" their mayor and was found by her fiancé in a matching bloody wedding dress and veil. During her murder trial, Camila begs to the court that she is wrongfully accused, but is eventually shunned by her own rich, prominent family and fiancé Vito dela Cuesta who testifies against her. Resulting in Camila's life imprisonment, she eventually gives birth to a beautiful baby girl in prison. Days later, a sudden freak fire encompasses the entire prison facility. Crying, desperate and unable to locate her newborn daughter, her last words exact revenge on every person who falsely accused her, all whilst her body burned in the flames. Also, she was occasionally a guest co-host on It's Showtime when many of the hosts of the show are absent.

2020–present: Professional expansion
In 2020, after ABS-CBN was shut down on free TV, along with its franchise being denied by 70 congressmen, Salvador joined the Brightlight Productions/Cornerstone Studios-produced show Sunday Noontime Live!, which is aired on TV5 via a blocktime agreement. However, after three months, the show aired its final episode.

In 2021, after 18 years under Star Magic, Salvador left Star Magic to establish her own talent agency called Crown Artist Management. She starred as Niña in Niña Niño. On the first story, Niña was a girl who do not believe in miracles. She thrived somebody's essentials to benefit her and her Lola Belen (Ruby Ruiz) whom born by her mother named Gloria (Lilet) then leaved for a reason due to poor living. After eight years, she returned to Brgy. Consolacion along with his second child Niño (Noel Comia Jr.). Gloria revealed she was beaten by her own husband and she is trying to get away. After sunset, Lola Belen went missing after a long hunting despite that she had died on collision. Meanwhile in Belen's demise in the family, they are convince to start acted as con-artist for their potential income to the siblings, after that when Niño had a stomachache, Niña  had caught by the tanods of the stealing property and both were run out quickly and they jump on a truck which brings them to Sitio Santa Ynez where they live a new life until an unexpected event changes everything.  While Niña and Niño escaped through the remote area of Sta. Ynez, they had to find ways in receiving true faith for themselves and connected to healing rituals while they found Ka Iking, they had discovered happy thought for earning big income and return on basic act. This little town was ruled by Kapitana Pinang (Dudz Teraña) who was very strict and interested on making more and more money. Later on they met Isay (Moi Bien). It premiered on April 5, 2021 on TV5's Todo Max Primetime Singko line up replacing Paano ang Pangako?.

On October 2, she officially joined the Eat Bulaga! to host the new segment DC 2021. She returned to ABS-CBN in the action TV series The Iron Heart starring Richard Gutierrez

Other ventures

Music career
In December 2013, it was announced that Salvador had signed a recording contract with Ivory Music & Video. While recording the album, Salvador worked with award-winning arranger and producer, Jonathan Ong. By March 2014, she revealed through her Instagram account that the title will be Believe along with its track listing which contains mainly original composition and two cover songs. The carrier single, "Dahan-Dahan", was released on March 6 while the album was released nationwide on March 25. The album also features collaborations with rapper Abra and Project Pinas. Salvador also co-wrote a song titled "Buong Gabi". She released her first single from the said album, also titled "Dahan Dahan".

In June 2014, the album was eventually certified gold for selling over 7,500 copies nationwide and Salvador appeared on ASAP to receive a Gold Record award. She also staged her first major sold-out concert entitled "MAJ: The Legal Performer" on July 12 at the Music Museum. On September 14, 2014 she released her second single called "Halikana" featuring Abra. The same month, the music reached at no. 7 in the Top 10 Philippine pop music chart.

On March 15, 2015, during an interview with Myx, she revealed details on her second album and that its carrier single will be released by the end of the month. On April 9, 2015, a photo was uploaded on Salvador's Facebook page showing herself on set to film a music video for the carrier single titled, "Bakit Ganito Ang Pag Ibig", with actor JC De Vera. The single was digitally released on April 17. Her second album, titled Maja in Love, was released on April 30. It features collaborations with Sam Milby and Rayver Cruz. In November, she staged her second major concert at the Mall of Asia Arena, dubbed as Majasty. She then again staged her third concert at the Music Museum, dubbed as #OnlyMaja.

In 2017, it was announced that Salvador will team up with Thai popstar with Tor+Saksit for a new single. The song, Falling into You, was released on February 9, 2018.

Advocacy and issues
In 2013, Salvador joined the PETA campaign to Free Mali from captivity in Manila Zoo and have her transferred to Boon Lott's Elephant Sanctuary where she can be given proper treatment and care. Mali is the only captive elephant in the Philippines and the zoo is considered to not have adequate knowledge or resources to properly care for her.

Filmography

Film

Television

Discography

Believe soundtracks

Maja in Love soundtracks

Awards and nominations

FHM Philippines 100 Sexiest Women

References

External links

1988 births
Living people
Filipino child actresses
Filipino film actresses
Filipino television actresses
Ilocano people
Maja
People from Cagayan
Star Magic
ABS-CBN personalities
Intercontinental Broadcasting Corporation personalities
TV5 (Philippine TV network) personalities
GMA Network personalities
Far Eastern University alumni
21st-century Filipino singers
21st-century Filipino women singers
Filipino television variety show hosts